The 1954 Tour de Suisse was the 18th edition of the Tour de Suisse cycle race and was held from 7 August to 14 August 1954. The race started and finished in Zürich. The race was won by Pasquale Fornara.

General classification

References

1954
1954 in Swiss sport
1954 Challenge Desgrange-Colombo